Canto Popolare is an arrangement for viola with piano accompaniment, made by the English composer Edward Elgar. It is from the viola solo in the central section of his concert-overture In the South (Alassio), written in 1904.

Following the success of the overture, Elgar was asked to make arrangements of the melody for any instrument: the most important being the version for viola with piano accompaniment, edited by the violist Alfred Hobday. The vocal version, "In Moonlight", was set to words by Percy Bysshe Shelley. Other versions were for small orchestra; and for violin, cello and clarinet accompanied by piano. The composer sent corrected proofs of the arrangements to the publisher Novello & Co at the end of September 1904.

"Canto popolare" (Italian) means "folk song" and the melody has been described as coming from a Neapolitan love song.
Elgar first suggested that the melody had come from a popular Italian song, but later admitted that it was his own invention.

Recordings 
Solo with piano accompaniment
Vellinger String Quartet – James Boyd (viola), Piers Lane (piano); Classics for Pleasure (1994)
Heartache, An Anthology of English Viola Music – Dame Avril Piston (viola), Shamonia Harpa (piano); Guild GmbH; GMCD 7275 (2004)
The Art of the Clarinettist – Colin Bradbury (clarinet) and Oliver Davies (piano); Clarinet Classics CC0008

Videos 
The viola serenade section from "In the South"
 Unknown soloist with the BBC Symphony Orchestra conducted by Sir Adrian Boult, Bedford Corn Exchange, 1944
 Giovanni Pasini (viola) with the Malaysian Philharmonic Orchestra conducted by Paul Mann, Kuala Lumpur, 2008

References

Compositions by Edward Elgar
Compositions for viola
1904 compositions